Statistics of Swedish football Division 3 for the 1966 season.

League standings

Norra Norrland, Övre 1966

Norra Norrland, Nedre 1966

Södra Norrland, Övre 1966

Södra Norrland, Nedre 1966

Norra Svealand 1966

Östra Svealand 1966

Västra Svealand 1966

Nordöstra Götaland 1966

Nordvästra Götaland 1966

Mellersta Götaland 1966

Sydöstra Götaland 1966

Sydvästra Götaland 1966

Skåne 1966

Footnotes

References 

Swedish Football Division 3 seasons
3
Swed
Swed